Thomas James John Walker (October 30, 1927 – June 6, 1998) was a provincial level politician from Alberta, Canada. He served as a member of the Legislative Assembly of Alberta from 1975 to 1979 sitting with the governing Progressive Conservative caucus.

Political career
Walker ran for a seat to the Alberta Legislature in the 1975 Alberta general election. He defeated incumbent Leighton Buckwell in a closely contested race to pick up the Macleod electoral district for the governing Progressive Conservative party. He retired from provincial politics at dissolution of the assembly in 1979.

References

External links
Legislative Assembly of Alberta Members Listing

Progressive Conservative Association of Alberta MLAs
1927 births
1998 deaths